Coleophora repentis is a moth of the family Coleophoridae. It is found in the Alps and the Tatra Mountains.

The larvae feed on Gypsophila repens.

References

repentis
Moths of Europe
Moths described in 1947